Dubei is a township of Xinhua District, in the northwestern suburbs of Shijiazhuang, Hebei, People's Republic of China, it has one residential community seven villages under its administration.

See also
List of township-level divisions of Hebei

References

Township-level divisions of Hebei